Government Medical College, (Koshur; سرکآرؠ طِبہ ژاٹٔھل ڈۄوڈہ) established in 2020, is a full-fledged tertiary referral Government Medical college. This college offers the degree Bachelor of Medicine and Surgery (MBBS). The college is affiliated to University of Jammu and is recognised by National Medical Commission.  This is one of the largest hospitals in the Doda. The selection to the college is done on the basis of merit through National Eligibility Entrance Test.

Courses
Government Medical College, Doda undertakes education and training of students MBBS courses

See also

References

External links 
 http://gmcdoda.in/

2020 establishments in Jammu and Kashmir
Educational institutions established in 2020
Medical colleges in Jammu and Kashmir